Melanie Wong (born October 30, 1986) is an American professional racing cyclist. She signed to ride for the UCI Women's Team  for the 2019 women's road cycling season.

References

1986 births
Living people
American female cyclists
Place of birth missing (living people)